This is a list of airlines which have an Air Operator Certificate issued by the Civil Aviation Authority  of Guyana.

See also 
List of defunct airlines of Guyana
List of airlines

References 

 
Airlines
Guyana
Airlines
Guyana